I Take This Woman is a 1940 American drama film directed by W. S. Van Dyke and starring Spencer Tracy and Hedy Lamarr. Based on the short story "A New York Cinderella" by Charles MacArthur, the film is about a young woman who attempted suicide in reaction to a failed love affair. The doctor who marries her attempts to get her to love him by abandoning his clinic services to the poor to become a physician to the rich so he can pay for her expensive lifestyle.

Plot
On the way to New York in a ship, a famous psychiatrist, Dr. Karl Decker (Spencer Tracy), sees a young girl, Georgi (Hedy Lamarr)  attempting suicide by jumping from the top because of a failed romance with Phil Mayberry (Kent Taylor). The doctor rescues her and makes her understand how to live by doing real work.

After reaching New York, she visits the doctor and joins him in his practice at a clinic for the poor. They fall in love and marry. The doctor leaves his clinic and joins a famous hospital so that he can earn more money to support his wife in style. He becomes highly successful, and the owner takes him as a business partner.

Meanwhile, Phil pesters her to renew their love affair, saying that he still loves her. She finally meets with him at his apartment and asks him to stop disturbing her, realizing that she loves Karl instead. Before Georgi and Karl can depart for a belated honeymoon, Karl learns that Georgi and Phil had met in his apartment. Believing that she still loves Phil, Karl breaks off his relationship with Georgi in spite of her protest.

An important call comes from the hospital regarding a suicidal case of a young girl. Karl rushes to the hospital, but the girl dies in spite of his efforts. On the death certificate, he writes "suicide," but the father of the girl opposes him, wanting to avoid any scandal. Karl will not listen to him, and finally decides to quit working for the hospital and travel to China to do research. Before his departure, he visits his old clinic. His former patients are pleased, having heard from Georgi that he was planning to open the clinic again. But he refuses in spite of their disappointment. When some of the children, whose lives he saved, entreat him to reopen the clinic, he relents at last. Georgi asks, "Can I stay too?" Karl happily agrees, and the film ends as they kiss.

Cast
 Spencer Tracy as Dr. Karl Decker
 Hedy Lamarr as Georgi Gragore Decker
 Verree Teasdale as Madame "Cesca" Marcesca
 Kent Taylor as Phil Mayberry
 Laraine Day as Linda Rodgers
 Mona Barrie as Sandra Mayberry
 Jack Carson as Joe, the man yelling in the subway
 Paul Cavanagh as Bill Rodgers
 Louis Calhern as Dr. Martin Sumner Duveen
 Frances Drake as Lola Estermont
 Marjorie Main as Gertie
 George E. Stone as Sid the Taxi Driver
 Willie Best as Sambo, the Clinic Attendant
 Don Castle as Dr. Ted Fenton
 Dalies Frantz as Joe Barnes 
 Reed Hadley as Bob Hampton 
 Robert Milasch as Vendor (uncredited) 
 Charles Trowbridge as Dr. Morris (uncredited)

Production notes
 Production Dates: 18 Oct – early Nov 1938; 7 Nov 1938 – late Jan 1939; 4 Dec – late Dec 1939
 This picture was based on the unpublished original story "A New York Cinderella," by Charles MacArthur.
 Production of the film had a long and troubled history, earning it the infamous nickname I Re-Take This Woman. Director Josef von Sternberg began shooting in October 1938, but soon quit because of artistic differences; director Frank Borzage then took over, and the production was shelved in January 1939. W.S.  Van Dyke assumed direction, re-shooting nearly the entire picture, with many different cast members. Further re-takes were done in December, 1939.
 The film's suicide attempt thwarted by Spencer Tracy was referenced by comedian Louis C.K. on the April 28, 2015 episode of "Fresh Air" with Terry Gross.

Box office
According to MGM records the film earned $907,000 in the US and Canada and $528,000 elsewhere resulting in a loss of $325,000.

References

External links
 
 
 
 

1940 films
American black-and-white films
Films directed by W. S. Van Dyke
Metro-Goldwyn-Mayer films
1940 drama films
Films set in New York City
American drama films
Films based on short fiction
Films produced by Louis B. Mayer
Films scored by Bronisław Kaper
1940s English-language films
1940s American films